Raama Raavanan is a 2010 film based on the novel Manomi by Madhavikutty. It is directed by Biju Vattappara and produced by Raaffi Mathirra under the banner Ifar International. It stars Suresh Gopi, Mithra Kurian, Nedumudi Venu, Biju Menon, Sudheesh, Baburaj, Sonia, Krishna, Lena and others. The film was released on 30 July 2010.

Story
The story takes place in two countries: India and Sri Lanka. Annadurai was living with family in Sri Lanka. When the fight between the Tamilians and Sinhalese broke out, he fled to India with his family. There he lived in Tamil Nadu-Kerala border. When he was in Lanka he gave protection for a Sinhalese child named Manomi who lost her mother. After some years she reaches Annadurai's residence. But the whole family except Annadurai hated her. It was during this period Thiruchelvam, a member of LTTE reached seeking shelter in Annadurai's house. The acquaintance with Manomi led to love. Manomi and Thiruchelvam loved each other. Thiruchelvam reminded the situation that LTTE was against Sinhalese and it would affect their relationship. Other members of his gang also opposed the relationship with Manomi as he was assigned to carry out the mission.

Cast
 Suresh Gopi as Thiruchelvam
 Mithra Kurian as Manomi
 Nedumudi Venu as Annadurai
 Biju Menon as SP Surya Narayanan
 Baburaj as Kathireshan
 Mehad Babu as Subru
 Master Habeeb M.R. as Abi
 Lena as Malli
Narayanankutty
 Sonia
Krishna

References

External links
 Raamaraavanan.com
 Nowrunning.com
 Movie.webindia123.com
 Bharatstudent.com
 Snehasallapam.com
 Cinecurry.com
 Popcorn.oneindia.in
 Mallumovies.org

2010 films
2010s Malayalam-language films
Films scored by Kaithapram Damodaran Namboothiri